Mycobacterium arosiense is a newly described species of Mycobacterium. It is a scotochromogen that derives its name from Arosia, the Latin name for the city of Aarhus (Denmark), where the strain was first isolated.

It can be misidentified as Mycobacterium intracellulare by the commercial mycobacterium assay system, GenoType ® (Hein, Nehren, Germany).

It can cause osteomyelitis and lung disease.

References

External links
Type strain of Mycobacterium arosiense at BacDive -  the Bacterial Diversity Metadatabase

arosiense